The Zbruch Idol, Sviatovid (Worldseer) is a 9th-century sculpture, more precisely an example of a bałwan, and one of the few monuments of pre-Christian Slavic beliefs (according to another interpretation, it was created by the Kipchaks/Cumans). The pillar was commonly incorrectly associated with the Slavic deity Sviatovid, although current opinions on the exact meaning of all the bas-reliefs and their symbols differ. It is thought that the three tiers of bas-relief represent the three levels of the world, from the bottom underworld, to the middle mortal world and the uppermost, largest, world of heavenly gods.

It is suggested that the sculpture was disposed of or was buried in a pit some time after the baptism of Kyivan Rus, and acceptance of Christianity in Poland in 966, like various buried idols in Kyiv and Novgorod. In the 19th century, when the Zbruch River (a left tributary of the Dniester) changed its bed, the area where the pillar was buried became submerged. It was discovered during a drought near the village of Lychkivtsi, just north of Husiatyn, in 1848. The statue is now on display in the Archaeological Museum of Kraków in Poland, with exact copies located in a number of museums.

Description
The Zbruch Idol is a four-sided pillar of grey limestone,  in height, and has three tiers of reliefs engraved upon each of the four sides. It is possible that during the 1848 excavation of the monument its lower layer was broken off and lost. The reliefs are in rather poor condition, though some traces of original polychrome were found in the 1960s. The reliefs depict the following characters:

Three sides of the lowest tier show a kneeling, bearded entity who appears to support the upper tier on his hands; the fourth side is blank.
The middle tier shows a smaller entity with extended arms on all four sides. Only one of four sides has an entity with a tiny "child" figure.
The four sides of the uppermost tier have the largest figures of the idol, with four faces united beneath a tall rounded hat. Each of the sides has a distinct attribute: a ring or a bracelet; a drinking horn, or horn of plenty; a sword and a horse; and an eroded solar symbol.

Discovery and controversy
The statue was discovered in August 1848 in the village of Lychkivtsi (Liczkowce) in Galicia (then in the Austrian Empire, now in Ukraine), during a drought that made the bottom of the river visible. The owner of the village, Konstanty Zaborowski, brother of the late poet, Tymon, donated it to  Polish Count Mieczysław Potocki, who in 1850 reported it to the Kraków Scientific Society. It was also Potocki who first conjectured that the statue might represent Svetovid. Initially kept in the Library of the Jagiellonian University, in 1858 it was moved to the temporary exhibition of antiquities in the Lubomirski family palace and then to the headquarters of the Kraków Scientific Society. However, it was not until 1950 that it was placed on permanent exhibition. Since 1968 it has been kept in the Kraków Archaeological Museum.

Ever since the discovery of the monument there has been debate about what exactly the idol represents.

Andrei Sergeevich Famintsyn in his 1884 work "Ancient Slav Deities" argued against Lelewel's theory, and instead claimed that the Zbruch pillar is a representation of a single deity and that all four sides of each tier represented one entity. As was first suggested by Count Potocki, he identified the deity as a representation of the Slavic four-headed god Swiatowid, until then primarily associated with the island of Rügen, but now understood to be pan-Slavic. The reasoning was that historical sources mentioned the deity of Rügen as being kept in a wooden temple together with a sacred sword, a drinking horn and a horse. Famintsyn was also the first to recognize the three-tiered structure as being related to the three levels of the world, linking it to the Slavic deity Triglav.

The identification of the deity with Swiatowid was also supported by Gabriel Leńczyk, who was also the first to identify the eroded solar symbol on the side, previously believed to be without attributes. Another theory was presented by Henryk Łowmiański, who in his 1979 monograph on the religion of Slavs suggested that the idol was altogether non-Slavic, as it was made of stone, and not of wood, which was the basic construction material of the Slavs, but the legends of Swiatowid exist among all Slavic cultures nonetheless.

Boris Rybakov in his 1987 work Paganism of Ancient Rus  argued that four sides of the top tier represent four different Slavic gods, two female and two male, with their corresponding middle-tier entities always of the opposite gender. In Rybakov's hypothesis, the male deity with the horse and sword is the Lightning god Perun, the female with the horn of plenty is Mokosh, the female with the ring is Lada, and the male deity with the solar symbol, above the empty underworld, is Dažbog, (the God of sunlight for whom the sun was not an object but an attribute, thus the symbol's position on his clothing rather than in his hand ). Further, Rybakov suggests the underworld deity as Veles.

Rybakov also claimed the side with the female figure holding a horn as the front of the idol, based on the bottom-tier figure, which is shown with legs as if seen from head-on, the two adjoining sides showing the legs from the side, and the fourth side left blank. Finally, Rybakov believes that the idol's overall phallic shape is meant to unite all of the smaller figures as a single overarching all seeing larger deity, Rod.

According to Aleksey Komar and Natalia Khamaiko (2011), the sculpture is a fake produced by Tymon Zaborowski, whose estate was located near the place where the statue was found.

Popular Culture 

A reproduction of the idol figures in the 2022 film The Northman.

References

Bibliography
 Weigel. Bildwerke aus altslawischer Zeit. Archiw fur  Anthropologie,  1882,  Bd.  XXI
 Комар А., Хамайко Н. Збручский идол: памятник эпохи романтизма? // Ruthenica. Київ, 2011. Том X. C. 166–217. 

Slavic mythology
Slavic paganism
Archaeological sites in Poland
Archaeological sites in Ukraine
9th-century artifacts
Archaeological discoveries in Ukraine
1848 archaeological discoveries
9th century in religion
9th-century sculptures
Drinking horns